This is a list of films from the Independent Lens series on PBS. All airdates are relative to this series as many of these films were screened, either in theaters or on television, before becoming a part of the Independent Lens series. After the third season, PBS expanded and relaunched the series in 2003 declaring what is technically the fourth season as the new first season. As a result, any reference made by PBS or ITVS to a season number will be three less than the number represented in this list. For example, PBS declares the 2007-2008 season as season 6, but this complete list shows it as season 9. The 2014-2015 season is regarded as the 13th season for the series.

Series overview

Episodes

Season 1 (1999)

Season 2 (2000)

Season 3 (2001)

Season 4 (2003)
Note: After the third season, PBS expanded and relaunched the series in 2003 declaring what is technically the fourth season as the new first season. As a result, any reference made by PBS or ITVS to a season number will be three less than the number represented in this list. For example, PBS declares the 2007-2008 season as season 6, but this complete list shows it as season 9.

Season 5 (2003-04)
Episode 510 is a short film block titled "Man Bites Shorts".
Episode 518 "T-Shirt Travels" was first broadcast on PBS on June 1, 2002, but not as part of the Independent Lens series.
* The New Americans is a seven-hour, three-part special, and therefore does not have an episode number.

Season 6 (2004-05)
Episode 608 is a short film block titled "Short, Not Sweet".

Season 7 (2005-06)
Episode 710 is a short film block titled "Short Stack: Lost & Found".

Season 8 (2006-07)
Episode 803 "Still Life with Animated Dogs" was first broadcast on PBS on March 29, 2001, but not as part of the Independent Lens series.
Episode 809 is a short film block titled "Short Stack 2006".

Season 9 (2007-08)

Season 10 (2008-09)

Season 11 (2009-2010)

Season 12 (2010-11)

Season 13 (2011-12)

Season 14 (2012-13)
"Half the Sky: Turning Oppression Into Opportunity for Women Worldwide" was a special co-presentation between Independent Lens and Show of Force.
Episode 1410 "Kind Hearted Woman" is a co-presentation with the PBS series Frontline (U.S. TV series).

Season 15 (2013-14)

Season 16 (2014-15)

Season 17 (2015-16)

Season 18 (2016-17)

Season 19 (2017-18)

Season 20 (2018-19)

Season 21 (2019-2020)

References

External links

Independent Television Service: Film Catalog (Major producer of Independent Lens films; alphabetical list)
Independent Lens Broadcast Schedule
Independent Lens Film Guide (Searchable by topic or title, for all episodes beginning with season 4)
Independent Lens Community Cinema (Provides public screenings nationwide of select films from current season)
Independent Lens Community Classroom (Educator resources and video modules related to select films)
PBS Pressroom

Lists of television films
Lists of American non-fiction television series episodes